The Foster–Seeley discriminator is a common type of  FM detector circuit, invented in 1936 by Dudley E. Foster and Stuart William Seeley. The Foster–Seeley discriminator was envisioned for automatic frequency control of receivers, but also found application in demodulating an FM signal. 

The Foster–Seeley discriminator uses a tuned RF transformer to convert frequency changes into amplitude changes. A transformer, tuned to the carrier frequency,  is connected to two rectifier diodes. The circuit resembles a full-wave bridge rectifier.  If the input equals the carrier frequency, the two halves of the tuned transformer circuit produce the same rectified voltage and the output is zero. As the frequency of the input changes, the balance between the two halves of the transformer secondary changes, and  the result is a voltage proportional to the frequency deviation of the carrier. 

Foster–Seeley discriminators are sensitive to both frequency and amplitude variations, unlike some detectors. Therefore a limiter amplifier stage  must be used before the detector, to remove amplitude variations in the signal which would be detected as noise. The limiter acts as a class-A amplifier at lower amplitudes; at higher amplitudes it becomes a saturated amplifier which clips off the peaks and limits the amplitude.

Other types of FM detectors are:

 Slope detector
 Ratio detector
 Quadrature detector
 Phase-locked loop detector

Footnotes

External links
 schematic and operation

Communication circuits
Demodulation
de:Diskriminator#Auswertung frequenzmodulierter Signale